Vicki! (stylized as Vicki!) was a syndicated talk show hosted by actress and Carol Burnett Show alumna Vicki Lawrence from 1992 to 1994. The show earned a number of Daytime Emmy Award nominations, including Outstanding Talk Show Host; however, it ended after two seasons, mainly because of creative disagreements between the host and her syndicator, Group W.

Background
After the end of Mama's Family and being the host of the game show Win, Lose or Draw, Vicki Lawrence was put together with Group W to do a talk show. Lawrence was uninterested in hosting a tabloid show showcasing dysfunctional topics as other talk shows of the time and instead wanted to have fun topics and celebrity guests. Her motto was "Fun. Entertainment. Information."

Vicki's Summer Vacation 
In the summer of 1993, in order to try and work out tensions between her and Group W and the show Vicki Lawrence was put on a summer vacation and was replaced by series of guest hosts, although she returned by the end of the Summer.

Cancellation
The show was renewed after the first season, with Lawrence having more creative control, but tensions escalated so much between her and Group W  over the direction the show should be going in, that they fired her, although some reports of the time stated that she departed.

References

External links

1992 American television series debuts
1994 American television series endings
1990s American television talk shows
First-run syndicated television programs in the United States
Westinghouse Broadcasting